Daruwalla is a Parsi surname. Notable people with the surname include:

Bejan Daruwalla (1931–2020), Indian English professor and astrology columnist 
Keki N. Daruwalla (born 1937), Indian poet and short story writer
Nancy Daruwalla (born 1987), Maharashtrian cricketer
Khushroo B. Daruwalla (born 1975), Information Technology - WZCC Youngest Entrepreneur and Professional 
Jehan Daruvala (born 1998), Indian Formula 2 Driver, Member of the Red Bull Racing Junior Team
Ruhshad N Daruwalla (born 1986), Indian Actor and singer

Indian surnames